Hemidesmus is a genus of plants in the family Apocynaceae, first described in 1810. It is native to the Indian Subcontinent.

Species
 Hemidesmus cordatus (Poir.) Schult. - India
 Hemidesmus indicus (L.) R. Br. ex Schult. - Pakistan, India, Bangladesh

formerly included
 Hemidesmus indicus var. pubescens Hook.f., syn of Finlaysonia wallichii (Wight) Venter
 Hemidesmus pubescens Wight & Arn., syn of Finlaysonia wallichii  (Wight) Venter
 Hemidesmus wallichii Wight, syn of Finlaysonia wallichii (Wight) Venter

References

Apocynaceae genera
Periplocoideae
Flora of the Indian subcontinent